Brown Paper Tickets is a Seattle-based business which provides ticket management support for any organizer hosting any sort of ticketed event. On October 25, 2022, Events.com acquired Brown Paper Tickets and announced that the companies would merge.

Brown Paper Tickets attempts to provide ways for event organizers to provide tickets with lower costs than larger ticket companies. The organization emphasizes simplicity in its ticketing sales process. The company's culture includes providing support to encourage employees to volunteer for charitable causes for 40 hours yearly.

In 2020 the company failed to return money for events canceled in the wake of the COVID-19 pandemic, as well as payments on tickets for events held before COVID-19-related shutdowns, resulting in a wave of lawsuits and complaints filed with the Better Business Bureau.

References

External links

Brown Paper Tickets Interview with CEO Steve Butcher, a 6-minute documentary on the organization

Ticket sales companies
Companies based in Seattle